Wadsworth Township is one of the seventeen townships of Medina County, Ohio, United States.  The 2000 census found 3,996 people in the township.

Geography

Located in the southeast corner of the county, it borders the following townships and city:
Sharon Township - north
Copley Township, Summit County - northeast corner
Norton - east
Chippewa Township, Wayne County - south
Milton Township, Wayne County - southwest
Guilford Township - west
Montville Township - northwest corner

The city of Wadsworth occupies central Wadsworth Township.

Name and history
It is the only Wadsworth Township statewide.

Government
The township is governed by a three-member board of trustees, who are elected in November of odd-numbered years to a four-year term beginning on the following January 1. Two are elected in the year after the presidential election and one is elected in the year before it. There is also an elected township fiscal officer, who serves a four-year term beginning on April 1 of the year after the election, which is held in November of the year before the presidential election. Vacancies in the fiscal officership or on the board of trustees are filled by the remaining trustees.

Public safety in Wadsworth Township is the responsibility of the Wadsworth Fire Department and the Medina County Sheriff's Office.

References

External links
County website

Townships in Medina County, Ohio
Townships in Ohio